WKKY is a commercial FM radio station in Geneva, Ohio, USA, broadcasting at 104.7 MHz with a country music format. The station broadcasts using the HD Radio format.

The station was started by Donald E. Martin on April 28, 1982 as WDON. On September 16, 1987, Martin organized Ray-Mar Broadcasting Company, and assigned to the station to the company, which was subsequently turned over to Warren T. Jones who is the son of Theodore Jones in Chardon. The station's call letters were changed to WKKY on July 10, 1992. Ray-Mar changed its name to Music Express Broadcasting Corporation of Northeast Ohio on August 9, 1994.

References

External links
Official Website

Mass media in Ashtabula County, Ohio
HD Radio stations
KKY